Mafalda of Portugal (1153, Coimbra – after 1162) was a Portuguese infanta, the fourth legitimate child and third daughter of Afonso Henriques (the first king of Portugal) and his wife Mafalda of Savoy.

In January 1160, her father and Ramón Berenguer IV, Count of Barcelona, negotiated the marriage of Mafalda to Alfonso, future King Alfonso II of Aragon who at that time was three or four years old. After the death of Ramón Berenguer IV in the summer of 1162, King Ferdinand II of León convinced his widow, Queen  Petronilla, to cancel the infante's wedding plans with Mafalda and for Alfonso to marry instead Sancha, daughter Alfonso VII of León and his second wife Queen Richeza of Poland.

This did not compromise the establishment of long-lived good relations between Portugal and Aragon, since Mafalda's younger brother Infante Sancho (future Sancho I of Portugal) married Dulce Infanta of Aragon, sister of Alfonso II in 1174.

References

Bibliography 

 
 

1153 births
Portuguese infantas
People from Coimbra
12th-century Portuguese people
12th-century Portuguese women
Year of death unknown
Daughters of kings